Karen Bishko is a British singer/songwriter. Her lyrics often present a humorous perspective on life's challenges, especially regarding love. She formerly worked as a professional portrait artist.

Background 

Karen Bishko was born in London. She has a BA degree in the History of Art from the University of Manchester and a BA degree in Fine Art from Central Saint Martin's School of Art. Bishko also studied counseling at the Metanoia Institute in London.

Career 

In 1993, Bishko was one of the original students on the BBC fly-on-the-wall documentary series, The Living Soap. Soon after, she began her work as a portrait painter, which she did until 2005.

Around this time, musicians, Jess Bailey and Gary Kemp of Spandau Ballet, heard her songs and encouraged her to focus her attention on her music.

Bishko then recorded an album entitled Singles for Singles, which was released on iTunes in 2009. In addition to working with Jess Bailey and Gary Kemp, she has worked with producers such as Stephen Lironi (Jon Bon Jovi, Hanson) and Yoad Nevo (Jem, Goldfrapp).

Bishko opened for the English pop group, Take That, on their Beautiful World tour in 2007. She performed at the 18,000 capacity London O2 Arena and Manchester Arena (MEN), solidifying her decision to pursue music. Her manager, Paul Burger (former President of Sony Records Europe), further encouraged her to continue with her music, and she decided to write a musical. As a result, Therapy Rocks came into existence.

Single 

The musical Single, underwent a title change - its first being Therapy Rocks, which was performed as part of the New York Musical Theatre Festival in 2010 at the Off-Broadway theatre, the Urban Stages Theater. It was directed by Thomas Caruso (Matilda The Musical) with Boko Suzuki (Rent, Sunset Boulevard, Phantom of the Opera) as music director; the show was sold out, and therefore, extended.

Theatre reviewer Oscar E. Moore said: "What a great score. Possibly some songs that could make it from the show and onto the charts. Character-driven, atmospheric, and rousing- every song serves the show's intentions, leading up to an incredible finale, 'Gonna Be.'"

The cast featured Rachel Stern (Shrek the Musical), who won Festival Best Actress Award, Joshua Davis (Beautiful: The Carole King Musical), Dee Roscioli (Wicked), Allie Schulz (Grease), and Adam Halpin (Daddy Long Legs, Glory Days).

As stated by Tom Vaughan, the director of What Happens in Vegas, Victoria, and Doctor Foster: "Karen Bishko has created a personal, heartfelt, and compelling story supported by great humor and catchy, emotional songs. The characters are relatable and wonderfully flawed, and Leah is a heroine for our times. It is the most honest musical I have ever seen."

A screenplay version of the stage play is being developed with Vaughan attached to direct and Nat Bennett as writer.

Single was presented at the New York Musical Theatre Festival in August 2016. Before the festival, Bishko's song "Gonna Be" had been mentioned as the third song on TheaterMania's list of the top five songs from the upcoming New York Musical Festival that people needed to hear. Critic Zachary Stewart said: "Retooled and revised, Single promises to be one of the highlights of the festival."

After the presentation of Single at summer 2016's NYMF, the piece received favorable reviews. One such review by Suzanna Bowling read:

The book is witty and smart, with men laughing more than women. The lyrics mature, quirky and poetic. The music is like a new shoe that feels comfortable and welcomed. There is a feeling of fun and optimism even though they are based on the bad luck of the draw in love and dating. This show comes from the heart and we’ve all either been there ourselves or know someone who has.

A review by MR Anderson of Theater Pizzazz also reflected on the musical:

Hands down, one of the heaviest-hitting rock comedies of this festival is Single... Nat Bennett & Karen Bishko’s book is hysterical, easily some of the funniest scene material in the NYMF. With a head-banging, diverse score with music and lyrics by Karen Bishko, Single is beyond tight in its execution... Overall, the show is quick, hilarious, and affecting. Single is a riot with a heart of gold.

A production of Single is planned for Autumn 2020 at the New Wolsey Theatre in the UK.

Bishko is currently living in New York and recently wrote ten songs for a new musical, Shadows, directed and co-created by twice Tony-nominated, Joey McKneely (West Side Story). In December 2018, Shadows had a 16 night run at the Connelly Theatre in NYC. Reviewer Max Berry wrote, "The songs were wonderfully written and packed quite the punch. Going from the energetic and hopeful "Dream Date" to the scared and regret-filled "Grand Design," which broke my heart in the best way possible." Bishko's music was nominated for "Outstanding Original Music" by NYIT (New York Innovative Theatre Awards).

Karen recently worked with multi-platinum selling Neopolitan-Austrian singer, Patrizio Buanne, doing German to English lyric translations, including his latest release, "Only Your Love Takes Me Home".

Bishko is also working as Associate Producer for Greenleaf Productions, whose shows include Matilda, The Book of Mormon, Groundhog Day, The Inheritance and SIX.

References

External links 
 http://www.karenbishko.com/index.html
 http://www.nymf.org/
 http://www.karenbishko.com/paintings.html
 http://www.sohoartists.co.uk/artist/karen-bishko

English women singers
English songwriters
Year of birth missing (living people)
Living people